The Angel Peak Scenic Area is a BLM recreation area located about 15 miles south of Bloomfield in San Juan County, New Mexico.  The recreation area, more than 10,000 acres of rugged terrain, features Angel Peak (elevation 6,988 feet), colorful badlands and deep canyons.

Geology
Angel Peak and the higher terrain are made up of the Eocene San Jose Formation (sandstone), and the badlands are made up of the underlying Paleocene Nacimiento Formation: shale, mudstone, and fine sandstone.

Facilities
Three picnic areas and a campground are located along the canyon rim overlooking Angel Peak and the Kutz Canyon badlands. Angel Peak Campground has nine sites available for tent camping, and features a short nature trail.

Access to the area is via graded county road 7175, from  US 550.

See also
Bisti/De-Na-Zin Wilderness
Ah-Shi-Sle-Pah Wilderness Study Area
San Juan Basin

References

External links
Angel Peak photo gallery from BLM
Angel Peak Scenic Area at Americansouthwest.net

Bureau of Land Management areas in New Mexico
Cenozoic New Mexico
Protected areas of San Juan County, New Mexico
Colorado Plateau